Antiretroviral drugs are used to manage HIV/AIDS. Multiple antiretroviral drugs are often combined into a single pill in order to reduce pill burden.

Some of these combinations are complete single-tablet regimens; the others must be combined with additional pills to make a treatment regimen.

References

External links